Miloš Božović (born 10 December 1994) is a Montenegrin handball player for US Ivry Handball and the Montenegrin national team.

References

External links

1994 births
Living people
Montenegrin male handball players
People from Budva
Expatriate handball players
Montenegrin expatriate sportspeople in Croatia
Montenegrin expatriate sportspeople in Hungary
Montenegrin expatriate sportspeople in Slovenia
Montenegrin expatriate sportspeople in Spain
Liga ASOBAL players
BM Ciudad Real players
BM Valladolid players
RK Zagreb players